Lyudmila Vladimirovna Sapova (born 3 May 1984) is a Russian basketball small forward. She was part of the Russian team that won the 2011 European Championships. At the club level her team Dynamo Kursk placed third at the 2014–15 EuroLeague.

References

External links
Profile at eurobasket.com

1984 births
Living people
Russian women's basketball players
Basketball players from Moscow
Small forwards
Russian expatriate basketball people in Poland